Chachapoyas or Amazonas Quechua is a variety of Quechua spoken in the provinces of Chachapoyas and Luya in the Peruvian region of Amazonas.

Chachapoyas Quechua is critically endangered, as hardly any children are now learning it. Conila is said to be the last village where children are still able to speak it.

Chachapoyas Quechua belongs to Quechua II, subgroup II-B (Lowland Peruvian Quechua).

Bibliography
 Gerald Taylor, 2006. Diccionario Quechua Chachapoyas-Lamas (– Castellano)

References

Languages of Peru
Quechuan languages